Ethyan Jesús González Morales (born 6 June 2002), simply known as Ethyan, is a Spanish footballer who plays as a forward for Atlético Madrid B, on loan from CD Tenerife.

Club career
Born in Santa Cruz de Tenerife, Canary Islands, Ethyan joined CD Tenerife's youth setup in 2014, from UD Cruz Santa. He made his senior debut with the reserves on 17 February 2021, coming on as a second-half substitute in a 1–1 Tercera División away draw against CD Buzanada.

Ethyan scored his first senior goals on 20 February 2021, netting a brace for the B's in a 3–4 home loss against CD Vera. On 7 March, he scored four goals in a 5–1 home routing of Buzanada, and ended the campaign with 14 goals in only 16 appearances for the side as they missed out promotion in the play-offs.

Ethyan made his first-team debut on 15 August 2021, replacing Álex Bermejo late into a 2–1 away win against CF Fuenlabrada, in the Segunda División championship. On 1 September of the following year, he was loaned to Segunda Federación side Atlético Madrid B, for one year.

References

External links
Tenerife profile 

2002 births
Living people
Footballers from Santa Cruz de Tenerife
Spanish footballers
Association football forwards
Segunda División players
Segunda Federación players
Tercera División players
CD Tenerife B players
CD Tenerife players
Atlético Madrid B players